Transbaikal or Trans-Baikal may refer to:
Transbaikal
Transbaikal Cossack Host
Transbaikal Front
Transbaikal Military District
Transbaikal zokor
Transbaikal Krai
White movement in Transbaikal

See also
 Lake Baikal